Acianthus elegans, commonly known as the elegant acianthus, is a species of mosquito orchids, plants in the genus Acianthus. It is found in New Caledonia.

Notes

References
 Morat, P., Jaffré, T., Tronchet, F., Munzinger, J., Pillon, Y., Veillon, J. M. & Chalopin, M. 2012. Le référentiel taxonomique Florical et les caractéristiques de la flore vasculaire indigène de la Nouvelle-Calédonie. Adansonia, 34(2), pages 179-221
 Munzinger, J., Morat, Ph., Jaffré, T., Gâteblé, G., Pillon, Y., Tronchet, F., Veillon, J.-M. & Chalopin, M. 2016. FLORICAL: Checklist of the vascular indigenous flora of New Caledonia. vers. 22.IV.2016. link (French)

External links 

elegans

Orchids of New Caledonia
Plants described in 1876